Natalie Dawn is an American singer-songwriter and musician. She is one half of the duo Pomplamoose with her husband Jack Conte and has released four studio albums and four EPs as of June 2022, in addition to numerous collaborations with other artists.

Early life
Born as the daughter of missionaries, she spent her childhood in Europe and attended schools in France and Belgium before she returned to the United States to study art and French literature at Stanford University.

Music career

Pomplamoose

At Stanford, Dawn met Jack Conte and formed Pomplamoose, eventually performing, recording, and editing songs and videos in their Northern California home. Their first song "Hail Mary" was featured on the front page of YouTube. In 2009, the duo began releasing cover versions of pop songs like Beyoncé's "Single Ladies (Put a Ring on It)" and Michael Jackson's "Beat It".

Solo work

Her Earlier Stuff (2009–2011)
In 2009, Dawn released her first studio album, Her Earlier Stuff, comprising twelve songs which were posted to her YouTube channel over the preceding two years.

In 2010, in collaboration with Lauren O'Connell, Dawn formed the side project, My Terrible Friend. In May 2011, it was announced that she would be joining Barry Manilow on his new album 15 Minutes, contributing vocals to the track "Letter from a Fan / So Heavy, So High".

How I Knew Her (2011–2015)
On July 17, 2011, Dawn announced she would be releasing a new album. She started a funding campaign on Kickstarter, where the initial goal of $20,000 was reached in just three days. On September 6, 2011, the album funding campaign was finalized with a grand total of $104,788.

In August 2012, Dawn signed as a solo artist to Nonesuch Records, which released her Kickstarter-funded album, How I Knew Her, on February 12, 2013. The album was produced by Jack Conte and recorded at Prairie Sun Recording Studios in Cotati, California in December 2011, with a full band which included Conte, Ryan Lerman, David Piltch, Louis Cole, and Matt Chamberlain. Oz Fritz engineered the album with Conte; it was mixed by Mike Mogis and mastered by Bob Ludwig.

Haze (2016–2021)
On October 29, 2016, Dawn released her third album, Haze.

On April 23, 2019, Dawn released her third extended play, For You. Later in 2019, her cover of "Careless Whisper" was featured in the fifth episode of HBO's Watchmen.

On May 18, 2021, Dawn released a personal update on the Pomplamoose YouTube channel in which she stated she was diagnosed with basal-cell carcinoma, a form of skin cancer, which was caught early.  Along with the health update, she stated that she would be recording a new solo record in the same month.  After her procedure, she stated she would be taking a few months off.

Gardenview (2022-present)
On March 1, 2022, Dawn released her first single since 2019 entitled "Follow the Light."  On March 24, "Over the Moon" was the second single released. Also on March 24, it was announced that these singles would be on her forthcoming fourth album Gardenview, with a release date of June 3.  On April 7, the third single along with the video for Danny was released.  On April 28, the fourth single "Joy" was released.  On May 12, the fourth single "Have You Heard" was released.  On May 19, the fifth single "Afternoon Tea" was released.  The video for "Joy" was released on June 3, the day the album was released.

Personal life
Dawn became engaged to Jack Conte in January 2016 and married in May 2016.  On May 18, 2021, she announced she was diagnosed with basal-cell carcinoma.

Discography

Albums

Studio albums

Extended plays

Singles

As lead artist

As featured artist

Music videos

Other appearances

Notes

References

External links
 
 
 Nonesuch Records artist page

American expatriates in Belgium
American expatriates in France
Living people
Guitarists from California
Stanford University alumni
American YouTubers
21st-century American women guitarists
21st-century American guitarists
Music YouTubers
YouTube vloggers
Pomplamoose members
21st-century American women singers
21st-century American singers